Lincolnshire is a home rule-class city in Jefferson County, Kentucky, United States. The population was 148 at the 2010 census.

Geography
Lincolnshire is located in east-central Jefferson County at  (38.224052, -85.620893). It is bordered to the northeast by St. Regis Park, to the southeast by Cambridge, and otherwise by consolidated Louisville/Jefferson County.

Demographics

As of the census of 2000, there were 154 people, 61 households, and 43 families residing in the city. The racial makeup of the city was 96.75% White, and 3.25% from two or more races. Hispanic or Latino of any race were 1.95% of the population.

There were 61 households, out of which 24.6% had children under the age of 18 living with them, 65.6% were married couples living together, 3.3% had a female householder with no husband present, and 27.9% were non-families. 23.0% of all households were made up of individuals, and 11.5% had someone living alone who was 65 years of age or older. The average household size was 2.52 and the average family size was 3.00.

In the city, the population was spread out, with 18.2% under the age of 18, 9.1% from 18 to 24, 21.4% from 25 to 44, 31.2% from 45 to 64, and 20.1% who were 65 years of age or older. The median age was 46 years. For every 100 females, there were 111.0 males. For every 100 females age 18 and over, there were 103.2 males.

The median income for a household in the city was $66,667, and the median income for a family was $66,250. Males had a median income of $51,250 versus $26,250 for females. The per capita income for the city was $29,200. About 3.9% of families and 5.2% of the population were below the poverty line, including 11.8% of those under the age of eighteen and none of those 65 or over.

References

External links
City of Lincolnshire official website

Cities in Jefferson County, Kentucky
Cities in Kentucky
Populated places established in 1953
1953 establishments in Kentucky